Carthaginian was a three-masted barque outfitted as a whaler that served both as a movie prop and a museum ship in Hawaii.  Laid down and launched in Denmark in 1921 as the three-masted schooner Wandia, she was converted in 1964–1965 into a typical square-rigged 19th-century whaler for the filming of the 1966 movie Hawaii. Afterward, she was moored in the harbor of the former whaling port-of-call of Lāhainā on the Hawaiian island of Maui, explaining the whaling industry in the Hawaiian islands. Carthaginian was lost in 1972 when she ran aground just outside the harbor on its way to drydock maintenance on Oahu and was replaced as a whaling museum by Carthaginian II in 1980.

History 
Carthaginian was built in 1921 in Denmark as the three-masted schooner Wandia and sailed for its owner, Captain Petersen, for 30 years in the Baltic Sea hauling cargo. After a few years as a commercial fishing vessel based in Iceland it was purchased and taken to Central America as a general cargo ship. Wandia was scheduled to take part in the inaugural Operation Sail procession in New York Harbor in July 1964, sailing under a Panamanian flag.

Wandia was unsuccessful hauling cargo in Central America, and it was purchased by R. Tucker Thompson in November 1964 after an inspection in Acapulco. It was delivered to San Diego later that year. After advertising its availability, Thompson sold the ship to the Mirisch Company, a Hollywood production company, which was filming Hawaii. Thompson held an option to be the first to repurchase the ship after filming was completed. Under Mirisch it was outfitted in the Southern California port of San Pedro as a barque, square-rigged on its main and fore masts and fore and aft rigged on its mizzen, to resemble a 19th-century whaler for scenes in the 1966 film Hawaii. The cost of the refit was US$150,000. The refit was performed under the supervision of noted vintage sailing ship experts Alan Villiers (who served as captain), Ken Reynard (mate), Karl Kortum, and Bill Bartz, who then sailed the ship to Hawaii. Upon its arrival, it was renamed Carthaginian for the ship of that name in the 1959 novel Hawaii by James A. Michener, on which the 1966 film was based.

After filming was complete in November 1965 Thompson re-purchased Carthaginian and sailed it back to California, calling in Lahaina along the way. Larry Windley, director of the non-profit "Lahaina Restoration Foundation" (LRF), convinced its members to purchase the ship as a tourist attraction harking back to Lahaina's time as a whaling port. When the Carthaginian next made land in Hilo on the Big Island of Hawaii, LRF representatives met the ship and made Thompson an offer to purchase it. Following the brief return voyage to California, where stops included Sausalito, Thompson made plans to sail Carthaginian to Tahiti over five months, advertising for 20 working crew who would each pay US$1500 for the privilege. The ship sailed from San Diego on August 4, 1966, and returned to Lahaina in January 1967, where it was converted into a whaling ship museum and tourist attraction with Thompson serving as Captain and Curator. Thompson left in 1968, and LRF declared it would be maintained as a working vessel, making an annual trip to dry dock on Oahu under a volunteer crew.

Carthaginian was featured in the opening scenes of the sequel to Hawaii, The Hawaiians (1970), captained by Whip Hoxworth, played by Charlton Heston. Carthaginian was destroyed after it ran aground on the Lahaina Reef on Easter Sunday 1972 (April 2, 1972) while sailing to dry dock at Oahu, and another ex-Baltic Sea cargo schooner, later renamed Carthaginian II, was acquired to replace it in 1973. The wreck was broken up in place; after being stripped of its masts, rigging, exhibits, and figurehead, pieces of the hulk were hauled away on a barge and taken to a dump in Olowalu.

Notes

References

External links 
 
 
 
 

Maui
Whaling museums
1921 ships
Sailing ships of Denmark
Shipwrecks of Hawaii
Lahaina, Hawaii